Macbeth is a 1979 videotaped version of Trevor Nunn's Royal Shakespeare Company production of the play by William Shakespeare. Produced by Thames Television, it features Ian McKellen as Macbeth and Judi Dench as Lady Macbeth. The TV version was directed by Philip Casson.

The original stage production was performed at The Other Place, the RSC's small studio theatre in Stratford-upon-Avon. It had been performed in the round before small audiences, with a bare stage and simple costuming. The recording preserves this style: the actors perform on a circular set and with a mostly black background; changes of setting are indicated only by lighting changes.

Cast
Ian McKellen as Macbeth
Judi Dench as Lady Macbeth
John Bown as Lennox
Susan Dury as 3rd Witch / Lady Macduff
Judith Harte as 2nd Witch / Gentlewoman
Greg Hicks as Donalbain / Seyton
David Howey as Sergeant / 1st Murderer / Doctor
Griffith Jones as Duncan
Marie Kean as 1st Witch
Ian McDiarmid as The Porter / Ross
Bob Peck as Macduff
Duncan Preston as Angus
Roger Rees as Malcolm
Zak Taylor as Fleance / Messenger
Stephen Warner as Young Macduff
John Woodvine as Banquo

External links 

 

1979 television plays
Films based on Macbeth
British television films